Rudolf Hansen (30 March 1889 – 12 October 1929) was a Danish long-distance runner. He competed in the marathon at the 1920 Summer Olympics.

References

External links
 

1889 births
1929 deaths
People from Næstved Municipality
Athletes (track and field) at the 1920 Summer Olympics
Danish male long-distance runners
Danish male marathon runners
Olympic athletes of Denmark
Sportspeople from Region Zealand